The Moravița or Moravica (/ Moravica); in its upper course ) is a left tributary of the river Bârzava (or Brzava) in Romania and Serbia. Its lower course has been canalized. It discharges into the Danube–Tisa–Danube Canal, which is connected to the Bârzava, near Barice. It flows through the villages Șemlacu Mare, Șemlacu Mic, Butin, Percosova, Dejan and Moravița in Romania, and Vatin and Margita in Serbia.

References

Rivers of Romania
Rivers of Serbia
Rivers of Timiș County
Rivers of Caraș-Severin County